Stephen Edward Shafer (born December 8, 1940) was a Canadian football player who played for the BC Lions. He won the Grey Cup with them in 1964. He played college football at Utah State University and was drafted by the San Francisco 49ers in the 1963 NFL draft. He was later a football coach in the National Football League (NFL), over the span of 1983 to 2003 serving on the staffs of the Los Angeles Rams, Tampa Bay Buccaneers, Oakland Raiders, Carolina Panthers, Baltimore Ravens, and Jacksonville Jaguars. He lives in Lincoln, California.

References

1940 births
BC Lions players
Living people
Utah State University alumni
People from Burbank, California
People from Lincoln, California